Caroe may refer to:

 W. D. Caröe (1857–1938), British architect.
 Martin Caroe (1933−1999), British conservation architect.
 Olaf Caroe (1892–1981), administrator in British India.
 Alban Caroe (1904−1991), British architect.
 Athelstan Caroe (1903-1988), grain merchant.
 Caroe, hamlet in Otterham, Cornwall, England.